Pearl's Diner is a Canadian animated short film, directed by Lynn Smith and released in 1992. Using cutout animation, the film depicts the interactions of Pearl, a waitress in a diner, with her customers.

The film won the Genie Award for Best Animated Short Film at the 14th Genie Awards.

References

External links
 

1992 short films
1992 films
Canadian animated short films
Best Animated Short Film Genie and Canadian Screen Award winners
1990s Canadian films